Benjamin David Bradley (born 11 December 1989) is a British Conservative Party politician who has been the Member of Parliament (MP) for Mansfield, Nottinghamshire, since the 2017 general election. 

On 8 January 2018, during Prime Minister Theresa May's Cabinet reshuffle, Bradley was appointed as Vice Chairman of the Conservative Party for Youth. He resigned his role on 10 July 2018 in protest against May's strategy in relation to Brexit. He is also the chairman of Blue Collar Conservatives.

Bradley was a councillor on Ashfield District Council from May 2015 to September 2017. He has served on Nottinghamshire County Council since May 2017. After being elected to the House of Commons in June 2017, Bradley chose to resign from Ashfield Council whilst remaining as a Nottinghamshire county councillor. In May 2021, Bradley became Leader of the Council.

Early life
Bradley was born on 11 December 1989 in Ripley, Derbyshire, to Chris, a police officer, and Sally Bradley, a public servant. He was privately educated at Derby Grammar School, a selective independent school based in the western Littleover area of Derby.

Bradley briefly attended the University of Bath and the University of Salford, but did not complete his undergraduate studies at either. On returning to the East Midlands, he worked in a variety of jobs including as a landscape gardener, bartender and a supermarket shelf stacker. He subsequently attended Nottingham Trent University where he studied politics, graduating in 2013. He became interested in politics whilst at university.

After leaving university he worked for four months as a recruitment consultant.

He then became campaign manager and later constituency office manager for Mark Spencer, Conservative MP for Sherwood.

Political career
Whilst working for Conservative MP Mark Spencer, Bradley was elected as Conservative councillor for the Hucknall North Ward on Ashfield District Council in May 2015, taking the newly created third seat for the ward following the approval of new ward boundaries. As well as working for Spencer, Bradley subsequently worked as a senior parliamentary assistant to Nick Boles, the then Conservative MP for Grantham and Stamford.

He was elected to Nottinghamshire County Council for the Hucknall North seat in May 2017.

Bradley was selected as the Conservative candidate for Mansfield for the June 2017 snap general election. He overturned a Labour majority of 5,315 to become the first ever Conservative MP for the seat. The constituency had been represented by the Labour Party's Alan Meale since 1987 – before Bradley was born. Labour had held this seat since 1923. Aged 27, he was one of the youngest MPs elected in the 2017 general election, despite the acting Returning Officer wrongly announcing Meale as the victor.

Following his election as an MP, Bradley stepped down in September 2017 from his district council seat, and a by-election the following month saw the new Conservative Party candidate defeated by an Independent candidate for the vacant seat. He has been criticised by political rivals for not standing down as a county councillor following his election to Parliament on the grounds that he had missed key local votes while working in London. However, he argued that his new role as an MP meant that he had better links with which to do his job as a councillor.

He won Parliamentary Beard of the Year in December 2017, after the seven-time former winner, Jeremy Corbyn, was not allowed to stand.

Bradley sits on the Education Select Committee conducting Inquiries in to Special Educational Needs amongst other issues, and on the All-party Parliamentary groups for Ending Homelessness, Coalfields, Youth Services and Skills and Employment.

At the 2021 UK local elections, Bradley became the Leader of the Nottinghamshire County Council, having been elected to the Mansfield North Division.

On 14 December 2021, Bradley broke the party whip to vote against elements of the government's 'Plan B' COVID-19 restrictions, which included vaccine passports and mandatory COVID-19 vaccination of NHS staff. However, he voted in favour of the expansion of laws requiring face coverings to be worn in public places.

On 12 May 2022, at a meeting of the full Nottinghamshire County Council, Bradley was re-affirmed as leader until 2025. He was adamant that the dual-responsibilities of "...two high-profile, high-intensity roles" had worked well during the first year.

Political philosophy
Bradley has said that his political motivation can be summarised as "that if you're willing to do the right thing and work hard, you should be rewarded."

Brexit
Bradley voted for the United Kingdom to remain in the European Union in the EU membership referendum on 23 June 2016. Since the referendum, in which his constituency voted strongly to leave the EU, Bradley continued to support his party and voted for leaving the European Union.

Bradley had a mixed voting record on Theresa May's proposed withdrawal deal. On 8 January 2018, during Theresa May's cabinet reshuffle, Bradley was appointed as the Vice-Chair for Youth at CCHQ. He later submitted his letter of resignation from this position on 10 July 2018 in protest at her strategy for delivering Brexit.

Controversies

Issues arising from 2011–12 blog posts
Shortly after his appointment as a Conservative Party Vice Chair in January 2018, Bradley attracted criticism for a 2012 blog post in which he wrote of a "vast sea of unemployed wasters" who he suggested should have vasectomies in order to stop them having multiple children. He subsequently apologised for the remarks, saying that his "time in politics has allowed me to mature and I now realise that this language is not appropriate".

Later in 2016 he apologised for having written "For once, I think police brutality should be encouraged!" in 2011, three days after Mark Duggan was killed by the Metropolitan Police, an event which led to the 2011 riots in London and other English cities.

In 2018 Bradley was further criticised by the Labour Party for a 2011 blog post titled "Public sector workers: they don't know they're born!", in which he suggested that public sector workers should find alternative employment if they are unhappy with pay or working conditions.

2016 – 2018
In 2016, Bradley claimed online that Ashfield District Council had spent £17,000 paying an Indian company to call local residents from a call centre in Mumbai. After a local newspaper contacted Bradley to ask him about the false claims, he responded: "I admit the post about using an Indian call centre was untrue and I took it down. I was just emphasising the point that the Council was wasting money."

Whilst working for the Conservative MP Mark Spencer, both Bradley and Spencer were criticised in 2017 by the Parliamentary Commissioner for Standards for misusing taxpayers' resources, such as the MP's newsletter, to link to "overtly party-political content". Bradley was sent on a training course on how to use parliamentary resources appropriately.

In February 2018, Bradley falsely accused Jeremy Corbyn on Twitter of having "sold British secrets to communist spies" during the 1980s. Corbyn responded by instructing his solicitors to require Bradley to delete his tweet or face legal action on the grounds of libel. Bradley deleted the tweet following this legal complaint from Corbyn. He subsequently issued a full apology, agreed to make a substantial donation to a charity of Corbyn's choice and agreed to pay Corbyn's legal costs. A spokesman for Corbyn stated that the donation would be split between a homeless charity and a food bank, in Bradley's constituency of Mansfield. Two Conservative Party donors paid the £15,000 donation to the charities on behalf of Bradley. The apologetic post that Bradley made on Twitter became the most-shared tweet ever made by a Conservative MP.

That same year, Buzzfeed reported on emails sent by Bradley in 2016, wherein Bradley berated a local journalist, and threatened to cut off media access to the local branch of the Conservative party. This was in response to the journalist approaching Bradley for a comment on a series of Islamophobic posts made on a Conservative councillor's Facebook page. Bradley's response accused the journalist of 'childish backstabbing', as well as 'colluding' with the Labour Party, and described the Islamophobia story as 'crap'.

2020
On 23 October 2020, Bradley said that free school meal vouchers for deprived children in his constituency effectively handed cash directly to crack dens and brothels. These comments were criticised by some schools, food banks and anti-child poverty charities in Bradley's constituency.

Deputy Labour Party leader Angela Rayner accused Bradley of the "stigmatisation of working class families", calling his comments "disgraceful" and "disgusting". Writing to the co-chair of the Conservative party, Shadow Children's Minister, Tulip Siddiq said: 'I am sure that you will want to make clear that this kind of crass stigmatisation of children from poorer families is deeply damaging, and distance yourself from Mr Bradley's misleading and troubling comments". She called for Bradley to apologise. Bradley has since deleted the tweets, stating that "the context wasn't as clear as I'd thought it was."

Following an interim report on the connections between colonialism and properties now in the care of the National Trust, including links with historic slavery, Bradley was among the signatories of a letter to The Telegraph from the "Common Sense Group" of Conservative Parliamentarians. The letter accused the National Trust of being "coloured by cultural Marxist dogma, colloquially known as the 'woke agenda'".

Personal life
Bradley married his wife, Shanade, in 2015 and the couple have two sons. They live in Coddington – a village near Newark-on-Trent in Nottinghamshire – and also London.

Bradley played hockey at university level and has hockey coaching qualifications. He supports Nottingham Forest football club.

References

External links

1989 births
Living people
Conservative Party (UK) MPs for English constituencies
UK MPs 2017–2019
UK MPs 2019–present
People from Ripley, Derbyshire
Alumni of Nottingham Trent University
Conservative Party (UK) councillors
Councillors in Nottinghamshire
People educated at Derby School